Heinz Schulz (born 5 January 1935) is an East German former featherweight boxer who competed for the United Team of Germany and won the bronze medal at the Olympic Games in Tokyo 1964.

He competed for the SC Dynamo Berlin / Sportvereinigung (SV) Dynamo.

1964 Olympic results
Below is the record of Heinz Schulz, a featherweight boxer who competed  for the United Team of Germany at the 1964 Tokyo Olympics:

 Round of 32: defeated Thapa Bhim Bahadur (Nepal) by decision, 5-0
 Round of 16: defeated Philip Waruinge (Kenya) by decision, 5-0
 Quarterfinal: defeated Tin Tun (Burma) by decision, 5-0
 Semifinal: lost to Stanislav Stepashkin (Soviet Union) by knockout (was awarded bronze medal)

References

External links 

1935 births
Living people
Featherweight boxers
Olympic boxers of the United Team of Germany
Boxers at the 1964 Summer Olympics
Olympic bronze medalists for the United Team of Germany
Olympic medalists in boxing
German male boxers
Medalists at the 1964 Summer Olympics